Rice is a city in Benton County, Minnesota, United States. The population was 1,275 at the 2010 census.  Its zip code also encompasses Graham, Langola, and Watab townships.

Rice is part of the St. Cloud Metropolitan Statistical Area.

Geography

U.S. Highway 10 serves as a main route in the community.

The Mississippi River is located west of Rice, and Little Rock Lake is located east.

The terrain is largely sandy and flat and was historically prairie grassland and oak savannah. Today, numerous pine and poplar intersperse irrigated farm fields with small areas of prairie terrain.

Climate

History

Originally an Ojibway territory, Sand Prairie, saw its first settlers of European origin in the autumn of 1844. Under a mandate of the United States government and after the Ojibway ceded their land in the Treaty of 1837, the Territory of Minnesota was established in 1849.  Benton County became one of nine organized counties.  The village of Rice was named after Massachusetts born  hotelier and mill owner, George T. Rice.  Rice migrated to the village of Langola in 1864 to develop the area.  In 1877, the Northern Pacific Railroad came through, and George T. Rice hired F.W. Earl to build the Luther hotel.  The village of Rice became officially incorporated within Benton County, on July 18, 1890, as a farming community.

In 1993, Rice was named a Tree City USA by The National Arbor Day Foundation.

Rice has been awarded the "Minnesota Star City" designation for economic development.

Culture

Historical sites

 Immaculate Conception Church
 Old Rice Village Hall

Festivals and special activities

 Rice Loves Its Kids Month (February)
 Memorial Day Remembrance
 Summerfest (takes place in June)
 Little Rock Lake 4 July Pontoon Parade
 Half-Way Jam Outdoor Rock Music Festival (takes place annually during summer)
 Rice Fun Day and Kiddie Parade (takes place on the third Saturday in August)
 Arts and Craft Show (takes place on the first weekend of September)
 9/11 Remembrance
 Veteran's Day Remembrance
 Pearl Harbor Remembrance

Outdoor activities

 Benton Beach on Little Rock Lake is frequented by campers, fishermen and boaters during the summer, and ice fishermen in the winter.  The lake itself is maintained by the Little Rock Lake Association.
 Rice has its own game preserve and two taxidermy shops.  Meat raffles are a typical fundraising activity.
 Oak Hill Golf Course offers 18 holes of golf
 Rice is also home to Benton Beach Course, an 18-hole disc golf course that was host to the 2008 Minnesota Disc Golf Championship.  Another disc golf course, Mississippi Park Course, is in Rice.
 Athletic sports, snowmobiling, all-terrain vehicles, bicycling, and motorcycling are commonly enjoyed activities as well.

Curiosities and trivia

On April 14, 1886, Rice, along with Sauk Rapids and St Cloud, were hit by the Sauk Rapids Tornado. It is the deadliest in the history of Minnesota.
Rice Blacksmith Saw and Machine is an active family-owned blacksmith shop that has been in operation since 1940.

Churches

 Immaculate Conception Catholic Church
 Shepherd of the Pines Lutheran Church
 Graham Methodist Church
 Living Hope Church

Other attractions
Other attractions include the Great River Bike Trail, several parks, softball fields and an ice skating rink.

Education

K–12
The Sauk Rapids–Rice Schools system operates three elementary schools, one middle school, one high school, and has a District Office for Home School.  Rice Elementary School is the only one of these schools located within the city of Rice.  Many students living in Rice and within the boundaries of the Sauk Rapids–Rice School District attend Royalton schools as their proximity to Rice is significantly closer than most Sauk Rapids–Rice schools.  As with other Minnesota school systems, the Sauk Rapids–Rice Schools system has open enrollment.  The athletic team for the middle and high school is the Storm

Demographics

2010 census
As of the census of 2010, there were 1,275 people, 462 households, and 340 families living in the city. The racial makeup of the city was 97.3% White, 0.2% African American, 0.2% Native American, 0.1% Asian, 0.3% from other races, and 1.9% from two or more races. Hispanic or Latino of any race were 0.7% of the population.

There were 462 households, of which 49.1% had children under the age of 18 living with them, 59.3% were married couples living together, 7.8% had a female householder with no husband present, 6.5% had a male householder with no wife present, and 26.4% were non-families. 19.5% of all households were made up of individuals, and 3.9% had someone living alone who was 65 years of age or older. The average household size was 2.76 and the average family size was 3.18.

The median age in the city was 28.8 years. 32.4% of residents were under the age of 18; 7.5% were between the ages of 18 and 24; 39.6% were from 25 to 44; 15.7% were from 45 to 64; and 4.8% were 65 years of age or older. The gender makeup of the city was 52.7% male and 47.3% female.

2000 census
As of the census of 2000, there were 711 people, 247 households, and 185 families living in the city. The racial makeup of the city was 98.87% White, 0.70% Native American, 0.14% from other races, and 0.28% from two or more races. Hispanic or Latino of any race were 0.28% of the population.

There were 247 households, out of which 48.2% had children under the age of 18 living with them, 62.8% were married couples living together, 7.7% had a female householder with no husband present, and 25.1% were non-families. 19.4% of all households were made up of individuals, and 4.9% had someone living alone who was 65 years of age or older. The average household size was 2.88 and the average family size was 3.35.

In the city, the population was spread out, with 35.4% under the age of 18, 9.7% from 18 to 24, 35.3% from 25 to 44, 15.3% from 45 to 64, and 4.2% who were 65 years of age or older. The median age was 28 years. For every 100 females, there were 102.6 males. For every 100 females age 18 and over, there were 101.3 males.

The median income for a household in the city was $48,173, and the median income for a family was $52,222. Males had a median income of $32,794 versus $22,279 for females. The per capita income for the city was $16,882. About 5.2% of families and 6.3% of the population were below the poverty line, including 7.1% of those under age 18 and 33.3% of those age 65 or over.

References

Further reading

External links

City Website
Rice Chamber of Commerce

Cities in Benton County, Minnesota
Cities in Minnesota
St. Cloud, Minnesota metropolitan area
Minnesota populated places on the Mississippi River